The 1971 New Hampshire Wildcats football team was an American football team that represented the University of New Hampshire as a member of the Yankee Conference during the 1971 NCAA College Division football season. In its fourth and final year under head coach Jim Root, the team compiled a 4–4–1 record (3–2 against conference opponents) and finished third out of six teams in the Yankee Conference.

Schedule

References

New Hampshire
New Hampshire Wildcats football seasons
New Hampshire Wildcats football